Leverton may refer to:

Places
In England
 Leverton, Berkshire, a hamlet
 Leverton, Lincolnshire, a village
 North Leverton with Habblesthorpe, a village and parish in Nottinghamshire
 South Leverton, a village and parish in Nottinghamshire

Elsewhere
 Leverton, Missouri, a community in the United States

People 
 Jim Leverton (b. 1946), English musician
 Norm Leverton (1924-2009), Australian rules footballer
 Ruth M. Leverton (1908-1982), American home economist
 Thomas Leverton (c.1743-1824), English architect

See also 
 Laverton (disambiguation)